= Jaydin van der Eerden =

Dutch karateka

Personal information
- Nationality: Dutch
- Born: 23 June 1999 (age 25); Zaandam, Netherlands

Sport
- Sport: Karate

Jaydin van der Eerden (born 23 June 1999 in Zaandam) is a Dutch karateka competing in the kumite -55 kg division. She is 9 times Dutch National Champion and Dutch National record-holder in consecutive wins as she won the Dutch National title in 2009, 2010, 2011, 2012, 2013, 2014, 2015, 2016 and 2017. She is also the Dutch National record-holder in consecutive National titles with female teams as she took the gold in 2017 and 2018.

At the 19th WIKF European Championships in the Girls 16/17 -53kg and in the Girls Teams category. In the Open category she took home the bronze.

She is the all time highest ranking female karateka from the Netherlands on the WKF Ranking in the female -55kg category.

She started with karate at the age of 6 and has only fought for one club at that is CHOKU Zaandam. She has been a member of the Karate-Do Bond Nederland since 2013. She has represented the Netherlands in the U16, U18, U21 and Seniors categories.
